Luke Edwards (born 12 January 2002) is an Australian rules footballer who plays for the West Coast Eagles in the Australian Football League (AFL). He was recruited by West Coast with the 52nd draft pick in the 2020 AFL draft.

AFL career
As the son of former  player Tyson Edwards, he was eligible for a father–son selection, however, Adelaide declined to nominate him, leaving him free to be selected by any club at the 2020 AFL draft. Edwards was widely predicted to be a first round pick in the draft. He ended up as a fourth round pick for the West Coast Eagles.

Edwards made his debut against  in round 12 of the 2021 AFL season. His second match, the following round against  saw him get 27 disposals, 13 kicks and 14 handballs.

References

External links

2002 births
Living people
West Coast Eagles players
Australian rules footballers from South Australia
Glenelg Football Club players
West Coast Eagles (WAFL) players